Willem Holsboer (1905–1959) was a German stage and film actor.

Selected filmography
 Comradeship (1931)
 Peer Gynt (1934)
 Street Music (1936)
 People Who Travel (1938)
 Three Wonderful Days (1939)
 What Does Brigitte Want? (1941)
 The Little Residence (1942)
 Insolent and in Love (1948)
 Trouble in Paradise (1950)
 The White Adventure (1952)
 The Forester's Daughter (1952)
 The Missing Miniature (1954)
 The Royal Waltz (1955)
 Roses in Autumn (1955)
 I'll See You at Lake Constance (1956)
 The Beggar Student (1956)
 Restless Night (1958)
 Paprika (1959)

References

Bibliography
 Rolf Giesen & Manfred Hobsch. Hitlerjunge Quex, Jud Süss und Kolberg. Schwarzkopf & Schwarzkopf, 2005.

External links

1905 births
1959 deaths
German male film actors
Male actors from Stuttgart
German male stage actors